At the end of each regular season, the America East Conference names major award winners in baseball. Currently, it names a Coach, Pitcher, Player, and Rookie of the Year. With the exception of Rookie of the Year, which was added in 1996, the awards date to the 1990 season, the conference's first season of baseball. Through the 1996 season, the awards were known as the major awards of the North Atlantic Conference, the America East's former name.

Through the end of the 2019 season, Stony Brook has won 21 major awards, the most of any school in the conference. Maine has the second highest total, with 20. Three other schools have at least ten: Binghamton (19), Delaware (17), and Vermont (10).

In the conference's 25–year history, a single team has swept the awards six times. Three instances came before 1996 (when the conference Rookie of the Year was added as the fourth award): Central Connecticut in 1990 and Delaware in 1992 and 1995. Since 1996, Stony Brook swept the awards in 2011 and 2012, and Hartford did so in 2018.

Coach of the Year
The conference's Coach of the Year award is presented annually to its most outstanding baseball coach, as chosen by a vote of the conference's coaches at the end of the regular season. The award was first presented in 1990 and was known as the North Atlantic Conference Coach of the Year award through the 1996 season, after which the conference adopted its current name.

In 2014, Stony Brook's Matt Senk won the award for the third time, after the Seawolves went 33–16 in the regular season and won the America East's regular season title. Senk won four awards in five years from 2011 to 2015. 2014 was the sixth consecutive season in which the award was presented to the coach whose team won the conference's regular season title.

Binghamton head coach Tim Sinicki has won the most Coach of the Year awards, with six.

Maine is the only school to have multiple coaches win the award. Paul Kostacopoulos won it in 1997 and 2001, and Steve Trimper won it in 2013.

Winners by season
The following is a table of the award's winners in each season since it was inaugurated in 1990. The table also includes the winner's school, conference record and rank in the standings, and overall record.

Winners by school
The following is a table of the schools whose coaches have won the award, along with the year each school joined the conference, the number of times it has won the award, and the years in which it has done so.

Pitcher of the Year

The conference's Pitcher of the Year award is given annually to the best pitcher in the America East, as chosen by a vote of the conference's coaches at the end of the regular season. The award was first presented in 1990 and was known as the North Atlantic Conference Pitcher of the Year award through the 1996 season, after which the conference adopted its current name.

Hartford pitcher Sean Newcomb won the award in 2014. Newcomb went 8–2 with a 1.25 ERA on the year. He was the first Hawk to receive the award and was selected in the first round of the 2014 MLB Draft by the Los Angeles Angels. Newcomb became the first pitcher in the America East to be selected in the first round.

Stony Brook's Nick Tropeano is the only pitcher to win the award twice. He won the award in both 2010 (when he shared it with Binghamton's James Guglietti) and 2011.

Four of the award's winners – Maine's Larry Thomas, Northeastern's Adam Ottavino, Stony Brook's Nick Tropeano, and Hartford's Sean Newcomb – have gone on to pitch in the MLB.

Winners by season
The following is a table of the award's winners in each season since it was inaugurated in 1990.

Winners by school
The following is a table of the schools whose pitchers have won the award, along with the year each school joined the conference, the number of times it has won the award, and the years in which it has done so.

Player of the Year

The conference's Len Harlow Player of the Year award is given annually to the best pitcher in the America East, as chosen by a vote of the conference's coaches at the end of the regular season. The award was first presented in 1990 and was known as the North Atlantic Conference Player of the Year award through the 1996 season, after which the conference adopted its current name. It is named for Len Harlow, who worked in athletic communications for Maine and the conference.

In 2012, Stony Brook outfielder Travis Jankowski became the first America East Player of the Year award winner to be drafted in the first round of the MLB Draft, and the second America East player overall after Northeastern's Carlos Peña.

Delaware's Kevin Mench is the only player to win the award twice. He did so in 1998 and 1999.

Five recipients – Maine's Mark Sweeney, Delaware's Cliff Brumbaugh, Mench, Vermont's Matt Duffy, and Stony Brook's Travis Jankowski – have appeared in the MLB.

Winners by season
The following is a table of the award's winners in each season since it was inaugurated in 1990.

Winners by school
The following is a table of the schools whose players have won the award, along with the year each school joined the conference, the number of times it has won the award, and the years in which it has done so.

Rookie of the Year
The conference's Rookie of the Year award is given annually to the best freshman in the America East, as chosen by a vote of the conference's coaches at the end of the regular season. The award was added in 1996.

In 2014, Stony Brook closer Cameron Stone won the award. In the regular season, he had a 1.48 ERA and eight saves. He was the fifth consecutive Seawolf to win the award.

Two of the award's recipients – Delaware's Kevin Mench and Binghamton's Scott Diamond – later played in the MLB.

Winners by season
The following is a table of the award's winners in each season since it was inaugurated in 1990. The table also includes the winner's school, conference record and rank in the standings, and overall record.

Winners by school
The following is a table of the schools whose players have won the award, along with the year each school joined the conference, the number of times it has won the award, and the years in which it has done so.

References

America East Conference baseball
College baseball conference trophies and awards in the United States
NCAA Division I baseball conference coaches of the year
NCAA Division I baseball conference players of the year
NCAA Division I baseball conference freshmen of the year